John Cleland (c. 1709, baptised – 23 January 1789) was an English novelist best known for his fictional Fanny Hill: or, the Memoirs of a Woman of Pleasure, whose eroticism led to his arrest. James Boswell called him "a sly, old malcontent".

Publication of Fanny Hill
John Cleland began courting the Portuguese in a vain attempt to reestablish the Portuguese East India Company. In 1748, Cleland was arrested for an £840 debt (equivalent to a purchasing power of about £100,000 in 2005) and committed to Fleet Prison, where he remained for over a year. It was while he was in prison that Cleland finalised Memoirs of a Woman of Pleasure. The text probably existed in manuscript for a number of years before Cleland developed it for publication. The novel was published in two instalments, in November 1748 and February 1749. In March of that year, he was released from prison.

However, Cleland was arrested again in November 1749, along with the publishers and printer of Fanny Hill. In court, Cleland disavowed the novel and said that he could only "wish, from my Soul", that the book be "buried and forgot" (Sabor). The book was then officially withdrawn and not legally published again for over a hundred years. However, it continued to sell well in pirated editions. In March 1750, Cleland produced a highly bowdlerised version of the book, but it too was proscribed. Eventually, the prosecution against Cleland was dropped and the expurgated edition continued to sell legally.

Later life
None of Cleland's literary works provided him with a comfortable living and he was typically bitter about this. He publicly denounced his mother before her death in 1763 for not supporting him. Additionally, he exhibited a religious tendency toward Deism that branded him as a heretic. Meanwhile he accused Laurence Sterne of "pornography" for Tristram Shandy.

In 1772, he told Boswell that he had written Fanny Hill while in Bombay, that he had written it for a dare, to show a friend it was possible to write about prostitution without using "vulgar" terms. At the time, Boswell reported that Cleland was a "fine, sly malcontent". Later, he would visit Cleland again and discover him living alone, shunned by all, with an "ancient and ugly woman" as his sole servant. Josiah Beckwith in 1781 said, after meeting him, that it was "no wonder" that he was thought to be a "sodomite". From 1782 until his death on 23 January 1789 Cleland lived on Petty France, Westminster, "a few hundred yards from his childhood home in St James's Place". He died unmarried and was buried in St Margaret's churchyard in London.

Composition of Fanny Hill and after
Cleland's account of when Fanny Hill was written is difficult. For one thing, the novel has allusions to other novels that were written and published the same year (including Shamela). Further, it takes part in the general Henry Fielding/Samuel Richardson battle, with Pamela: or, Virtue Rewarded on one side and Joseph Andrews on the other. Furthermore, the novel's geography and topicality make a Bombay composition less likely than a Fleet Prison one. It is possible, of course, that a pornographic novel without vulgarity was written by Cleland in Bombay and then rewritten in Fleet Prison as a newly engaged and politically sophisticated novel.

Officially, Fanny Hill remained suppressed in an unexpurgated form until 1970 in the United Kingdom. However, in 1966 it became the subject of a famous US Supreme Court judgment 383 US 413 A Book Named "John Cleland's Memoirs of a Woman of Pleasure" v. Attorney General of Massachusetts, holding that under the US Constitution a modicum of merit precluded its condemnation as obscene. In fact, the novel is now regarded as a "stylistic tour de force" and as a participant in the "making legible the bourgeois remapping of certain categories constitutive of 'woman', and then exposing that remapping as ludicrous" (Gautier x). It has an exceptionally lively style, contains profoundly playful and ironic questions about womanhood, and has a satirical exposition of love as commerce and pleasure as wealth.

Fanny Hill and homosexuality
The fact that the passionate descriptions of copulatory acts in Fanny Hill are written by a man from the point of view of a woman, and the fact that Fanny is obsessed by phallic size, have led some critics to suggest it is a homoerotic work. This aspect of the novel, plus Cleland's presumed offence at Westminster School, lack of intimate friends, and his unmarried status have aided conjecture that he was homosexual, as has his bitter falling out with friend Thomas Cannon, author of the pamphlet Ancient and Modern Pederasty Investigated and Exemplify'd (1749), the earliest surviving published defence of homosexuality in English (Gladfelder).

The authorised edition of Fanny Hill also contains a scene where Fanny (to her disgust) comes across a man and a boy fornicating. The friendship of Cleland and Cannon was "volatile, verging on murderous", but in the opinion of Gladfelder, who rediscovered the Ancient and Modern Pederasty..., "It's no coincidence that they simultaneously produced the only two explicit accounts of male same-sex desire in English before the nineteenth century, published just a month apart in 1759." This may, however, simply reflect Cleland's knowledge of his friend's research, and the opportunity to use it in a novel that had a rare explicitness for the time.

Bibliography
Memoirs of a Woman of Pleasure, or, Fanny Hill (1749)
Memoirs of a Woman of Pleasure, or, Fanny Hill (1750) (expurgated, legal version)
Memoirs of a Coxcomb (1751)
Titus Vespasian (1755) (unperformed play)
The Ladies Subscription (1755) (unperformed play)
Tombo-Chiqui, or, The American Savage (1758) (unperformed play)
The Surprises of Love (1764)
The Surprises of Love: Exemplified in the Romance of a Day or an Adventure in Greenwich-Park Last Easter, The Romance of a Night or a Covent-Garden-Adventure, The Romance of a Morning or The Chance of a Sport, The Romance of an Evening or Who would have thought it ? (Collection of short stories)
The Woman of Honour (1768)
The Illustrated Fanny Hill
Memoirs of an Oxford Scholar
The Memoirs of Maria Brown (Genuine Memoirs of the celebrated Miss Maria Brown)
The Way to Things by Words, and to Words by Things
Other philological works, poetry, translations, periodical reviews and letters

In 1969, Molly Hill. Memoirs of The Sister of Fanny Hill was published, referring to the author as John Cleland. It suggests 17th century language, but should be considered a imitation.

Notes

References

Further reading
John Cleland (2005). Memoirs of a Coxcomb. Ed. Hal Gladfelder. Peterborough, ON: Broadview Press. 
Gary Gautier (2001). "Introduction". Fanny Hill or, Memoirs of a Woman of Pleasure. New York: Modern Library
Hal Gladfelder (2007). "In Search of Lost Texts: Thomas Cannon's 'Ancient and Modern Pederasty Investigated and Exemplified."  Eighteenth-Century Life 31(1)
J. H. Plumb (1965). "Introduction". Fanny Hill, or, Memoirs of a Woman of Pleasure. New York: Signet Classics
Peter Sabor (2004). "John Cleland" in H. C. G. Matthew and Brian Harrison, eds. The Dictionary of National Biography.  Vol. 12. London: Oxford University Press

External links

Complete text of Fanny Hill

1789 deaths
English people of Scottish descent
People educated at Westminster School, London
British East India Company civil servants
English erotica writers
Inmates of Fleet Prison
18th-century English male writers
18th-century English writers
18th-century English novelists
People imprisoned for debt
English male novelists
Year of birth uncertain